The 1925 Southern Conference football season was the college football games played by the member schools of the Southern Conference as part of the 1925 college football season. The season began on September 19. 1925 saw the south's widespread use of the forward pass.

In the annual Rose Bowl game, the SoCon champion Alabama Crimson Tide defeated the heavily favored PCC champion Washington Huskies by a single point, 20–19, and became the first southern team ever to win a Rose Bowl. It is commonly referred to as "the game that changed the south." Alabama halfback Johnny Mack Brown was the Rose Bowl game's MVP. Alabama therefore was named a national champion along with Dartmouth.

Tulane back Peggy Flournoy led the nation in scoring with his 128 points, a school record not broken until 2007 by Matt Forte. With also Lester Lautenschlaeger in the backfield to lead the Green Wave,  Tulane beat Northwestern i a game which helped herald the arrival of Southern football.

The Georgia Tech team, led by Doug Wycoff, had one of the best defenses in school history.

Season overview

Results and team statistics

Key

PPG = Average of points scored per game
PAG = Average of points allowed per game

Regular season

SoCon teams in bold.

Week One

Week Two

Week Three

Week Four

Week Five

Week Six

Week Seven

Week Eight

Week Nine

Week Ten

Week Eleven

Postseason

Bowl games

Awards and honors

All-Americans

E – J. G. Lowe, Tennessee (AP-3, BEHR)
E – Gus Merkle, Georgia Tech (BEHR)
T – Goldy Goldstein, Florida (BEHR)
T – Bob Rives, Vanderbilt (BEHR)
G – Bill Buckler, Alabama (AP-2; WE-3, BEHR)
G – Walt Godwin, Georgia Tech (COL-2; RKN, BEHR)
C – Amos Kent, Sewanee (BEHR)
QB – Lester Lautenschlaeger, Tulane (COL-3)
QB – Edgar C. Jones, Florida (BEHR)
HB – Peggy Flournoy, Tulane (AAB-2; AP-2; COL-3; NEA; BE-1; HR [qb]; NB-1; WE–3 [qb], BEHR)
HB – Johnny Mack Brown, Alabama (AP-3, BEHR)
FB – Pooley Hubert, Alabama (COL-2, AAB-2 [hb]; WE-2, NB-2 [qb], BEHR [qb])
FB – Doug Wycoff, Georgia Tech (BEHR)

All-Southern team

The following were selected by the composite All-Southern team compiled by the Associated Press.

References